The Twisleton-Wykeham-Fiennes family  are the descendants of the 16th Baron Saye and Sele who was born Frederick Benjamin Twistleton and adopted the surname Twisleton-Wykeham-Fiennes in 1849 by Act of Parliament. He was the grandson of Thomas Twisleton, 13th Baron Saye and Sele and inherited the barony from his first cousin William Thomas Eardley-Twisleton-Fiennes in 1847. The surname is frequently shortened to Fiennes. Members of the family include the explorer Ranulph Fiennes and the actors Ralph Fiennes, Joseph Fiennes, and Hero Fiennes Tiffin.

Ancestry
The ancestry of the family includes James Fiennes, 1st Baron Saye and Sele (c. 1395–1450) and his father William de Fiennes. Richard Fiennes, a nephew of the 1st Baron, became the 7th Baron Dacre after marrying the daughter of the 6th Baron Dacre.

The family are descendants of Thomas Wykeham, the great-nephew of William of Wykeham (c. 1320–1404) who left his fortune to his great-nephew. The inheritance included Broughton Castle which became the home of the Barons Saye and Sele, after Thomas Wykeham's granddaughter married William Fiennes, 2nd Baron Saye and Sele.

The Twisleton-Wykeham-Fiennes family are also descendants of John Twisleton (c. 1614–1682) who married Elizabeth Fiennes, the daughter of James Fiennes, 2nd Viscount Saye and Sele, 9th Baron Saye and Sele. Elizabeth Fiennes's mother was Frances Cecil, daughter of Edward Cecil, 1st Viscount Wimbledon, so the family also descends from William Cecil, 1st Baron Burghley.

Family tree
The Twisleton-Wykeham-Fiennes family members include:
 Frederick Benjamin Twisleton-Wykeham-Fiennes, 16th Baron Saye and Sele (1799–1887)
 Emily Twisleton-Wykeham-Fiennes (b. 1827)
John Twisleton-Wykeham-Fiennes, 17th Baron Saye and Sele (1830–1907)
Geoffrey Twisleton-Wykeham-Fiennes, 18th Baron Saye and Sele (1858–1937), soldier and Liberal politician
Geoffrey Twisleton-Wykeham-Fiennes, 19th Baron Saye and Sele (1884–1949)
Ivo Twisleton-Wykeham-Fiennes, 20th Baron Saye and Sele (1885–1968)
Nathaniel Fiennes, 21st Baron Saye and Sele (b. 1920)
Richard Fiennes (1959–2001)
Martin Fiennes (b. 1961)
Guy Fiennes (b. 1997)
Ned Fiennes (b. 1999)
Ivo Fiennes (b. 2000)
Susannah Fiennes (b. 1961), artist
Thomas Fiennes (1965–1968)
William Fiennes (b. 1970), author
Nathaniel Fiennes (b. 2015)
Ingel Twisleton-Wykeham-Fiennes (1922–1941), soldier
Oliver Fiennes (1926–2011), Dean of Lincoln
Celia Ruth Long-Howell (b. 1957)
Emily Long-Howell (b. 1987)
Charlotte Long-Howell (b. 1990)
George Long-Howell (b. 1992)
Laura Charlotte Hughes (b. 1959)
Charles Hughes (b. 1989)
Robert Hughes (d. 1992)
Lucy Hughes (b. 1994)
Adam Hugh Twisleton-Wykeham-Fiennes (b. 1961)
Milo Twisleton-Wykeham-Fiennes (b. 2012)
James William Twisleton-Wykeham-Fiennes (1964–2014)
Georgina Twisleton-Wykeham-Fiennes (b. 1998)
Hector Twisleton-Wykeham-Fiennes (b. 2001)
Evelyn Twisleton-Wykeham-Fiennes (1887–1887, 25 weeks)
Laurence Twisleton-Wykeham-Fiennes (1890–1962)
Ingelram Twisleton-Wykeham-Fiennes (1895–1896)
Allen Twisleton-Wykeham-Fiennes (1897–1920), soldier
Cicely Twisleton-Wykeham-Fiennes (1900–1985)
John Dunne (b. 1929)
Rosemary Dunne
 Beatrice Alfrey (1857–1929)
Eustace Fiennes, 1st Baronet (1864–1943), soldier and Liberal politician
John Eustace Twisleton-Wykeham-Fiennes (1895–1917), soldier
Ranulph Twisleton-Wykeham-Fiennes, 2nd Baronet (1902–1943)
Susan Twisleton-Wykeham-Fiennes (b. 1933)
Arabella Williams (b. 1959)
Venetia Scott (b. 1963)
Lola Teller (b. 1997)
Celia Twisleton-Wykeham-Fiennes (1936–2001)
Deirdre Brabenec (b. 1965)
James Brabenec (b. 1993)
Anthony Savage Brown (b. 1966)
Nicola Schlechte (b. 1969)
Alexandra Schlechte (b. 1993)
Gillian Twisleton-Wykeham-Fiennes (b. 1938)
Rosalind Hoult (b. 1961)
Rachel Hoult (b. 1963)
Andrew Hoult (b. 1966)
Ranulph Fiennes, 3rd Baronet (b. 1944), explorer
Elizabeth Twisleton-Wykeham-Fiennes (b. 2006)
 Edwyna Ramsden (1860–1931)
 Geoffrey Ramsden (1893–1990)
 Edith Crawfurd (1861–1929)
 Alexandra Broadent (1862–1938)
 Maud Twisleton-Wykeham-Fiennes (1866–1938)
 Gertrude Edmonds (1869–1948)
 Ivo Twisleton-Wykeham-Fiennes (1872–1947)
 William Twisleton-Wykeham-Fiennes (1879–1906)
 Unknown issue
 Cecil Twisleton-Wykeham-Fiennes (1831–1870)
 Emily Twisleton-Wykeham-Fiennes (1862–1934)
 Henry Twisleton-Wykeham-Fiennes (1866–1934)
 Cecil Twisleton-Wykeham-Fiennes (1867–1899)
 Ivo Twisleton-Wykeham-Fiennes (1833–1875)
 Bertram Twisleton-Wykeham-Fiennes (1865–1886)
 Dorothy Wright (1868–1961)
 Eva Twisleton-Wykeham-Fiennes (1873–1963)
 Nathaniel Twisleton-Wykeham-Fiennes (1876–1963)
 Idonea Twisleton-Wykeham-Fiennes (1902–1912)
 Geoffrey Twisleton-Wykeham-Fiennes (1906–1981)
 Elizabeth Twisleton-Wykeham-Fiennes (1916–1980)
 Unknown issue
Wingfield Stratford Fiennes (1834–1923)
Gerard Yorke Fiennes  (1864–1926)
Gerry Fiennes (1906–1985), railway manager
Jeremy Twisleton-Wykeham-Fiennes (b. 1937)
Nicole Juana Twisleton-Wykeham-Fiennes (b. 1968)
Joslin Mary Twisleton-Wykeham-Fiennes (b. 1939)
Julius Paul Landell-Mills (b. 1965)
Nicholas Vladimir Landell-Mills (b. 1967)
Natalia Norah Catsaias (b. 1972)
Michael Wynn Twisleton-Wykeham-Fiennes (b. 1941)
Rupert Yorke Twisleton-Wykeham-Fiennes (b. 1969)
Hugo Barnabas Twisleton-Wykeham-Fiennes (b. 1971), entrepreneur
Joshua Gisborne Twisleton-Wykeham-Fiennes (b. 1974)
Ivo Martindale Twisleton-Wykeham-Fiennes (b. 1978)
Bronwen Margaret Twisleton-Wykeham-Fiennes (b. 1944)
Helen Mary Addis (b. 1968)
Thomas Oliver Addis (b. 1970)
Harriet Jane Addis (b. 1972)
Sarah Elizabeth Ruth Addis (b. 1975)
Gerard Ivor Twisleton-Wykeham-Fiennes (b. 1946)
Clare Elizabeth Twisleton-Wykeham-Fiennes (b. 1976)
David Gerard Twisleton-Wykeham-Fiennes (b. 1982)
Richard Nathaniel Twisleton-Wykeham-Fiennes (1909–1988)
Frances Beatty (b. 1947)
Geraldine Swinton (b. 1971)
Rosanna Beatty (b. 1973)
Katherine Beatty (b. 1980)
Caroline Beatty (b. 1986)
Richard Twisleton-Wykeham-Fiennes (1950–2009)
Felix Twisleton-Wykeham-Fiennes (b. 1978)
Genevieve Twisleton-Wykeham-Fiennes (b. 2010)
Cressida Twisleton-Wykeham-Fiennes (b. 2012)
Eleanor Twisleton-Wykeham-Fiennes (b. 1983)
Isobel Twisleton-Wykeham-Fiennes (b. 1986)
Arabella Twisleton-Wykeham-Fiennes (b. 1988)
Sir John Saye Wingfield Twisleton-Wykeham-Fiennes, KCB, QC (1911–1996)
Judith Mary Twisleton-Wykeham-Fiennes (b. 1938)
Nicholas John Twisleton-Wykeham-Fiennes (b. 1940)
Alexander Twisleton-Wykeham-Fiennes (b. 1971)
John Twisleton-Wykeham-Fiennes (b. 1973)
Katherine Twisleton-Wykeham-Fiennes (b. 1974)
William Gerard Twisleton-Wykeham-Fiennes (b. 1946)
Lucy Anne Twisleton-Wykeham-Fiennes (b. 1981)
Timothy Gerard Twisleton-Wykeham-Fiennes (b. 1985)
Michael Yorke Twisleton-Wykeham-Fiennes (1912–1989)
Toby Twisleton-Wykeham-Fiennes (b. 1961)
Thomas Twisleton-Wykeham-Fiennes (b. 1995)
Emily Twisleton-Wykeham-Fiennes (b. 1995)
Caroline Twisleton-Wykeham-Fiennes (b. 1995)
Peter Twisleton-Wykeham-Fiennes (b. 1963)
Natalie Twisleton-Wykeham-Fiennes (b. 1991)
Alexander Twisleton-Wykeham-Fiennes (b. 1995)
Esme Twisleton-Wykeham-Fiennes (b. 1999)
David Eustace Martindale Twisleton-Wykeham-Fiennes (1916–1980)
Alberic Arthur Twisleton-Wykeham-Fiennes (1865–1919)
Celia Twisleton-Wykeham-Fiennes (1902–1998), artist
Sir Maurice Twisleton-Wykeham-Fiennes (1907–1994), industrialist
Mark Twisleton-Wykeham-Fiennes (1933–2004), photographer and illustrator
Michael Emery (adopted) (b. 1952), archaeologist
Ralph Fiennes (b. 1962), actor
Martha Fiennes (b. 1964), film director
Titan Fiennes Tiffin (b. 1995)
Hero Fiennes Tiffin (b. 1997), actor and model
Mercy Fiennes Tiffin (b. 2001)
Magnus Fiennes (b. 1965), composer
Cheyenne Fiennes (b. 1996)
Shanti Fiennes (b. 1997)
Sophie Fiennes (b. 1967), film director
Jacob Fiennes (b. 1970), conservation manager
 Unknown issue
 Unknown issue
Joseph Fiennes (b. 1970), actor
Sam Fiennes (b. 2010)
Isabel Fiennes (b. 2011)
 Unknown issue
 Unknown issue
 Unknown issue
 Unknown issue
Winifred Emily Cecil Omond (1871–1945)
Caryl Wentworth Twisleton-Wykeham-Fiennes (1869–1948)
Cecil Wingfield Twisleton-Wykeham-Fiennes (1897–1972)
Kathleen Patricia Shedden (1925–2015)
Emma Mant (b. 1959)
Alexandra Mant (b. 1996)
Lars Mant (b. 1999)
Simon Shedden (b. 1963)
Anthony Patrick Twisleton-Wykeham-Fiennes (1927–1989)
Nicholas Mark Twisleton-Wykeham-Fiennes (b. 1969)
Lucinda Grace Twisleton-Wykeham-Fiennes (b. 2001)
Penelope Ginger Twisleton-Wykeham-Fiennes (b. 2003)
Harriet Elizabeth Twisleton-Wykeham-Fiennes (b. 2004)
Thomas Louis Wykeham-Fiennes (b. 2009)
Nathaniel Twisleton-Wykeham-Fiennes
Marjorie Alice Twisleton-Wykeham-Fiennes (1899–1981)
Barbara Winifred Sholl (1908–1965)
John Temple Twisleton-Wykeham-Fiennes (1877–1970)
Bridget Susan Winifred Ford (b. 1935)
Josephine Marriott (b. 1957)
Esmeralda Marriott (b. 1959)
Prudence Marriott (b. 1964)
Crispin Marriott (b. 1966)
Samantha Marriott (b. 1968)
 Frederick Twisleton-Wykeham-Fiennes (1836–1896)
 Isabell Twisleton-Wykeham-Fiennes (d. 1915)
 Charles Twisleton (1808–1809)
 Edward Twisleton (1809–1874)
 Elizabeth Twisleton (d. 1873)

In the above tree, the name by which they are commonly known has been used. Thus the full surname of those in the tree using the surname Fiennes would normally be Twisleton-Wykeham-Fiennes. If the name change by the 16th Baron had not occurred, those of a male line would have the surname Twisleton. The 21st and current Baron Saye and Sele, Nathaniel Fiennes, changed his surname by deed poll to Fiennes in 1965.

See also
 Twisleton-Wykeham-Fiennes baronets
 Baron Saye and Sele
 Viscount Saye and Sele

References

 Fiennes Family, 1100 – 2004
 The Peerage.com

Fiennes family
English families
Show business families of the United Kingdom
People from Oxfordshire
People from Berkshire